The Manaus Brazil Temple is a temple of the Church of Jesus Christ of Latter-day Saints (LDS Church) in Manaus, Amazonas, Brazil.

The Manaus Brazil Temple is the sixth temple in Brazil, the first in the north region of the country, and receives patrons who formerly traveled long distances to attend the Caracas Venezuela Temple. It is located in the bairro of Ponta Negra, near the artificial beach. Manaus is the capital of the state of Amazonas and is located on the Rio Negro about 11 miles above its confluence with the Amazon River.

History
The announcement of the temple came on May 23, 2007. Construction began with a groundbreaking on June 20, 2008, by Charles Didier, the president of the Brazil Area, and Ulisses Soares and Stanley G. Ellis.

The temple was dedicated on June 10, 2012, by Dieter F. Uchtdorf of the church's First Presidency.

In 2020, the Manaus Brazil Temple was closed temporarily during the year in response to the coronavirus pandemic.

See also

 Comparison of temples of The Church of Jesus Christ of Latter-day Saints
 List of temples of The Church of Jesus Christ of Latter-day Saints
 List of temples of The Church of Jesus Christ of Latter-day Saints by geographic region
 Temple architecture (Latter-day Saints)
 The Church of Jesus Christ of Latter-day Saints in Brazil

References

External links

Manaus Brazil Temple Official site
Manaus Brazil Temple at ChurchofJesusChristTemples.org

2012 establishments in Brazil
21st-century Latter Day Saint temples
Religious buildings and structures completed in 2012
Temples (LDS Church) in Brazil
Manaus